Rosman Alwi (born 5 December 1961) is a Malaysian former cyclist. He competed at the 1984 Summer Olympics and the 1988 Summer Olympics.

References

External links
 

1961 births
Living people
Malaysian male cyclists
Olympic cyclists of Malaysia
Cyclists at the 1984 Summer Olympics
Cyclists at the 1988 Summer Olympics
Southeast Asian Games medalists in cycling
Southeast Asian Games gold medalists for Malaysia
Southeast Asian Games silver medalists for Malaysia
Southeast Asian Games bronze medalists for Malaysia
Competitors at the 1987 Southeast Asian Games
20th-century Malaysian people
21st-century Malaysian people